La Jolla Village Square is a retail power center with a collection of mostly big box retailers. Before 1992, was an enclosed upscale regional mall with department store anchors and an adjacent "convenience center" (or strip mall) portion. It is located in the La Jolla Village neighborhood of San Diego just south of UC San Diego (UCSD) and about one mile west of Westfield UTC, with which it used to compete as an upscale regional mall. It is across the street from "The Shops at La Jolla Village", whose tenants include Whole Foods Market, Nordstrom Rack, and CVS Pharmacy.

Current tenants
Current tenants include Ralphs and Trader Joe's supermarkets, Marshalls, Ross Dress for Less, Best Buy, DSW, PetSmart, Cost Plus World Market, and AMC Theatres. Eateries include California Pizza Kitchen, Chipotle Mexican Grill, Jamba Juice, Starbucks, Urban Plates, and ZPizza Tap Room.

History
Opened in 1979, original anchors were Bullocks Wilshire (later rebranded as I. Magnin) and May Company California. In 1988 when May Department Stores almost sold the mall to T&S Development Inc., it had 48 stores and 362,420 square feet of retail space, but the deal fell apart at the last minute. Four years later, May Centers was finally able to sell La Jolla Village Square to Gordon/Beck Ventures in 1992 after a number of years of trying to locate a buyer for this particular property.

The San Diego Reader called the mall in 1982 the city's "carriage-trade center" and noted that the pace seemed "genteel":

A 1992 plan led to the closure of the department stores (I. Magnin closed in 1993) and repurposed the property as a power center anchored by general and discount retailers, rather than upscale ones, including Whole Foods Market and Sav-on Drugs (became CVS in 2006).

References

Shopping malls in San Diego County, California
La Jolla, San Diego